Mantova 1911 Società a Responsabilità Limitata (Mantova 1911 s.r.l.), commonly referred to as Mantova, is an Italian football club based in Mantua, Lombardy. Mantova had played consecutively in the Italian Serie B from the 2005–06 season to 2009–10 as Associazione Calcio Mantova (A.C. Mantova), when they were relegated after ending the season in 20th place.

During the summer 2010, the club went bankrupt and was refounded as Mantova F.C., being immediately promoted in the following season from Serie D group B to Lega Pro Seconda Divisione.
The club went bankrupt again in 2017 and has since played three consecutive seasons in Serie D.

Colours and badge

Colours 
Mantova played in a sky blue shirt with white shorts and sky blue socks until 1956, when OZO company became the club's main sponsor. Colours were changed from sky blue and white to white and red, the colours of the company, in an unusual scheme for Italian football: white with a red sash. Mantova debuted in Serie A with this kit.

In the late 1960s, when the club had poor results, a red shirt with white shorts and red socks was adopted as the home kit. The OZO Mantova kit was reintroduced by the owner Fabrizio Lori in the 2000s, and since then became the home kit.

In the last years the away kit has usually retained the home kit scheme, inverting the colours: a white sash on a red base.

Sky blue has been used mainly for third kits. During the 2010-11 campaign, a special sky blue shirt with a white and red sash was released to celebrate the club's 100th anniversary and was used as the first choice kit for the final part of the season.

During the Serie B years between 2005 and 2008 Mantova used a yellow kit with a green sash to remember the "Piccolo Brasile", the team who achieved three promotions in four years between the end of the 1950s and the start of the 1960s.

Badge 
Mantova crest has always been characterized by two elements: the town's coat of arms and a light blue semicircle to remember the original colours of the team, combined in a round shape. The round element has been inserted in a red and white shield, with an upper white stripe in which the name of the club is written.

History
Mantova was founded in 1911. They played in Serie A for seven seasons: 1961–62, 1962–63, 1963–64, 1964–65, 1966–67, 1967–68, and 1971–72, being nicknamed in its initial period as "Little Brazil" ("Piccolo Brasile"). The green and yellow shirt actually remembered that period, by far the best one in the team history. Mantova has also played eight seasons in Serie B, winning the title 1970–71.

Mantova was cancelled two times from the Italian football panorama, in 1983 and 1994, both times due to insolvency.

Former famous players for the club include Dino Zoff, Angelo Sormani, Anton Alleman and Karl-Heinz Schnellinger.

Mantova was promoted from Serie C2 to Serie B in two consecutive seasons, in 2003–04 as league champions, and in 2004–05 as runners-up and playoff winners. Mantova begun the 2005–06 Serie B campaign introducing itself as a strong potential candidate for promotion to Serie A, despite its lack of players experienced with these levels (almost the same squad which promoted to Serie B the previous season) and a coach, Domenico Di Carlo, on just his second year as first team football trainer. The team led the Serie B table for a long part of the season, gaining an unexpected interest by the media. However, Mantova was not able to maintain the head of the league in the end, and the team concluded its season in fourth place, gaining a spot in the promotion playoffs. Successively, AC Mantova won its playoff semifinal against Modena after two ties (0–0, 1–1), qualifying because of its top placement in the regular season. The first playoff final, against Torino, saw Mantova winning at home 4–2. However, Mantova was not able to maintain this advantage in the return match, lost 3–1 in Turin after extra time, which allowed Torino to be promoted in Serie A because of a superior placement in the regular season.

During the 2006–07 season, Mantova became the first club to beat Juventus in a Serie B match. They ended the season in eighth place, confirming themselves in the top side of the league table. Following Di Carlo's resignations, Mantova appointed Attilio Tesser as new head coach for their 2007–08 Serie B campaign. As part of an ambitious summer transfer market, on 23 August 2007 Mantova signed former Italian international Stefano Fiore. However, the club's campaign proved to be disappointing as the team failed to break into the promotion playoff zone, resulting in the sacking of Tesser in the mid-season. He was replaced by Giuseppe Brucato, a young manager with no previous experience in the league, who guided the club to a mid-table finish in the season.

Brucato was confirmed as head coach of Mantova for the 2008–09 season. As Fiore parted company with the club following an unimpressive season with the virgiliani, he was replaced by Tomas Locatelli. However, Mantova failed to assure themselves a place in the higher ranks of the league, causing the sacking of Brucato following a 1–3 home defeat to Parma. The club successively appointed former Milan defender Alessandro Costacurta as its new head coach. Costacurta later resigned and was replaced by Mario Somma, who led the club to a final 13th place, only two points ahead the relegation play-off zone.

For the 2009–10 season, Mantova was guided by former Italian international Michele Serena. The financial situation of the club was deteriorated, which the club raised the short term profit by player exchange, but also raised the long term amortisation cost. The club had swapped Stefano Mondini with Christian Jidayi on 30 June 2008 in co-ownership deal for €750,000, made the clubs had player selling revenue of €1.5 million. June 2009 also saw Jidayi return to Cesena and Mondini back to Mantova; 50% of both players' rights were valued at €750,000. However, it became a financial burden for both clubs, which Mantova had to amortise Mondini's value (€1.5 million) in instalments as amortisation. In June 2008 Mantova also swapped Valerio Di Cesare (€1M) and Simone Calori (€0.5M) with Riccardo Fissore (€0.5M) and Mattia Marchesetti (€1M). Again, Mantova had to amortise €0.5M in for 3 seasons for Fissore (€166,667) and Marchesetti (€333,333).

At the beginning of 2010–11 season, Mantova went bankrupt and a new entity was admitted to Serie D. Mantova came first in Girone B and gained promotion to 2011–12 Lega Pro Seconda Divisione. They finished 16th and only escaped relegation after beating both Lecco and Vibonese in the playoffs. The first leg against Vibonese was a 0–0 stalemate away, leading to fears the club would not survive the second leg. However, Mantova went on to record a famous 4–0 victory. The home leg was viewed by over 3,000 spectators and Mantova enjoyed some of the strongest support of the 40 sides in Lega Pro Seconda Divisione. Throughout the 2011–12 season, Mantova sacked three managers and three sporting directors.

In the 2012–13 Lega Pro Seconda Divisione, Mantova had a solid season, finishing in ninth place, nine points short of a promotion playoff place and 11 points above a relegation playoff place. In the off season, 70% of Mantova is sold to former Sambonifacese president Michele Lodi, who became the president of Mantova.

The Lega Pro Seconda Divisione underwent a reformatting. The first eight teams in each girone, plus one team winning the relegation playoff round from each division will remain in Lega Pro. The last six teams in each girone, plus three relegation play-out losers from each division will be relegated to Serie D. In all, eighteen teams will remain in Lega Pro, and eighteen teams will be relegated to Serie D.

In the 2013–14 Lega Pro Seconda Divisione, Mantova finished eighth, which guaranteed them a spot in next season's 2014–15 Lega Pro Divisione Unica, the new Serie C. The team was part of the "Group A".
Mantova remained in the third tier until 2017.
At the start of season, the club did not join the 2017–18 Serie C, a successor club, Mantova 1911 S.S.D., was admitted to 2017–18 Serie D instead. In 2018 it was taken over by Maurizio Setti, the holder of Hellas Verona, who invested in the club to be promoted to Serie C. Mantova lost the championship to Como despite reaching 83 points, and it is now at its third consecutive season in Serie D.

Current squad
As of 31 January 2023.

Out on loan

Notable former players

Notable former coaches

Ottavio Bianchi
Roberto Boninsegna
Mario Corso
Alessandro Costacurta
Edmondo Fabbri
Nándor Hidegkuti

Honours
Serie B Championship: 1
Serie C Championship: 1
Serie C2 Championships: 3

Footnotes

References

External links
  
 History of the football in Mantova 

 
Football clubs in Lombardy
Association football clubs established in 1911
Italian football First Division clubs
Serie A clubs
Serie B clubs
Serie C clubs
Serie D clubs
1911 establishments in Italy
Phoenix clubs (association football)
2010 establishments in Italy
2017 establishments in Italy